Stephen Cutter Clark (August 6, 1892 - December 2, 1950) was sixth bishop of the Episcopal Diocese of Utah, serving from 1946 to 1950.

Biography 
Following studies at the University of California (B.A. 1914), he was ordained to the diaconate and priesthood in 1917. He was assigned as a minister of St. Luke's Church in Park City, Utah between 1917 and 1918. He became rector of St Paul's Church in Pomona, California in 1918. In 1927 he was appointed rector of St Mark's Church in Pasadena, California, a post he held until his election to the episcopate in an executive session of the House of Bishops on September 17, 1946. Clark was consecrated on December 6, 1946.

Bibliography 
A Brief History of the Diocese of Los Angeles (1945)

References 
"Bishop Clark Dies" in The Living Church, December 10, 1950.

1892 births
1950 deaths
20th-century American Episcopalians
Episcopal bishops of Utah
20th-century American clergy